Adenectomy, from the Greek aden (gland), and ektomē (to remove), is a surgical removal of all or part of a gland.

See also 
 List of surgeries by type

References 

Surgical removal procedures